Bwool may refer to:
Buol (city), Indonesia
Buol (village), Indonesia